Jalil Eftekhari (born 29 March 1965) is an Iranian former cyclist. He competed in two events at the 1988 Summer Olympics.

References

External links
 

1965 births
Living people
Iranian male cyclists
Olympic cyclists of Iran
Cyclists at the 1988 Summer Olympics
Place of birth missing (living people)
20th-century Iranian people